William Henry Ashley (c. 1778 – March 26, 1838) was an American miner, land speculator, manufacturer, territorial militia general, politician, frontiersman, fur trader, entrepreneur, hunter, and slave owner. Ashley was best known for being the co-owner with Andrew Henry of the highly-successful Rocky Mountain Fur Incorporated, otherwise known as "Ashley's Hundred" for the famous mountain men working for the firm from 1822 to 1834.

Early life and ventures

Although born a native of Powhatan County, Virginia, William Ashley had already moved to Ste. Genevieve, in what was then a part of the Louisiana Territory, when it was purchased by the United States from France in 1803.

Career 
On a portion of this land, later known as Missouri, Ashley made his home for most of his adult life. Ashley moved to St. Louis around 1808 and became a brigadier general in the Missouri Militia during the War of 1812. Before the war, he did some real estate speculation and earned a small fortune manufacturing gunpowder from a lode of saltpeter mined in a cave, near the headwaters of the Current River in Missouri. When Missouri was admitted to the Union, William Henry Ashley was elected its first lieutenant governor, serving from 1820 to 1824 under Governor Alexander McNair. Ashley was a candidate in the 1824 Missouri gubernatorial election, losing to Frederick Bates.

Entry into the fur trade

In the early 1820s, William Henry Ashley and Andrew Henry, a bullet maker he met through his gunpowder business, posted famous advertisements in St. Louis newspapers seeking one hundred "enterprising young men . . . to ascend the river Missouri to its source, there to be employed for one, two, or three years." The men who responded to this call became known as "Ashley's Hundred." Between 1822 and 1825, Ashley and Henry's Rocky Mountain Fur Company sponsored several large scale fur trapping expeditions in the mountain west. Jedediah Smith's party, part of Ashley's Hundred, were officially credited with the American discovery of South Pass in the winter of 1824. Ashley devised the rendezvous system in which trappers, Indians and traders would meet annually in a predetermined location to exchange furs, goods and money. His innovations in the fur trade earned Ashley a great deal of money and recognition, and helped open the western part of the continent to American expansion.

In 1825, he led an expedition into the Salt Lake Valley. South of the Great Salt Lake, he came across Utah Lake, which he named Lake Ashley. He established Fort Ashley on the banks to trade with the Indians. Over the next three years, according to 19th century historian Frances Fuller Victor, the fort "collected over one-hundred-and-eighty thousand dollars' worth of furs". In late 1824, he explored present-day northern Colorado, ascending the South Platte River to the base of the Front Range, then ascending the Cache la Poudre River to the Laramie Plains and onward to the Green River.

On June 2, 1823, Ashley was beaten by Arikara Indians at their villages near the Grand River. Ashley reported twelve men killed and eleven wounded, of whom two died.

Later political career
In 1826, Ashley sold the fur trading company to a group including Jedediah Smith but continued supplying the company and brokering their furs. Upon the death of Spencer Darwin Pettis in August 1831, he was elected to finish out Pettis's term in the United States House of Representatives. As a member of the Jacksonian Party, Ashley won election to the seat in 1832 and re-election in 1834. In 1836, he declined to run for a fourth term in Congress, instead running unsuccessfully in the 1836 Missouri gubernatorial election. Many attribute his defeat to his increasingly pro-business stance in Congress, which alienated the rural Jacksonians. After the loss, he went back to making money on real estate, but his health declined rapidly.

Death 
On March 26, 1838, Ashley died of pneumonia at age 59. Ashley was buried atop a Native American burial mound in Lamine Township, Cooper County, Missouri, overlooking the juncture of the Lamine River and the Missouri River.

William H. Ashley is the namesake of the small community of Ashley, Missouri. Also Ashley Falls and Ashley Creek in northeast Utah, and the Ashley National Forest are named for him.

References

Further reading 

 
 Morgan, Dale., The West of William H. Ashley, (Denver, 1964) ISBN

External links

 "Ashley, William Henry" The Columbia Electronic Encyclopedia, 6th ed.
 American National Biography - Ashley, William Henry
 William Ashley - National Park Service
 William H. Ashley's 1825 Rocky Mountain Papers

1770s births
Year of birth uncertain
1838 deaths
People from Powhatan County, Virginia
Jacksonian members of the United States House of Representatives from Missouri
Lieutenant Governors of Missouri
American fur traders
American slave owners
Politicians from St. Louis
People from Ste. Genevieve, Missouri